Donner Creek is a stream in Nevada County, California, that flows into and out of Donner Lake.  It is a tributary to the Truckee River.

Coldstream Canyon

A significant tributary to Donner Creek is Cold Creek, which drains Coldstream Canyon, a 12.5 square mile area south of Donner Lake, in and near Truckee.

Course

References

Rivers of Nevada County, California